MacArthur (IPA: [mək 'ɑːrθər]), officially the Municipality of MacArthur, is a 5th class municipality in the province of Leyte, Philippines. According to the 2020 census, it has a population of 21,578 people.

Geography

Barangays
MacArthur is politically subdivided into 31 barangays.

Climate

Demographics

Economy

References

External links
 [ Philippine Standard Geographic Code]
Philippine Census Information
Local Governance Performance Management System

Municipalities of Leyte (province)